The Norway women's national under-18 ice hockey team is the national under-18 ice hockey team in Norway. The team represents Norway at the International Ice Hockey Federation's IIHF World Women's U18 Championships.

History
The inaugural Norway national under-18 participation was on 12–14 December 2008 in Hønefoss. The team would compete at Division I, which were held in Chambéry, France from 28 December 2008 to 2 January 2009. Birger Aaserud og Kjersti Malo Dyb lead the national team.

Their division competition were: Japan, France, Slovakia and Austria. They lost in every match, earned a goal deposit of 9–16 and avoided relegation as there is no placement lower than last team of Division I. Japan earned a promotion.

The 2010 IIHF World Women's U18 Championship – Division I tournament was on 3–9 April in Piešťany, Slovakia. They faced France, Slovakia and Austria, relegated Switzerland, and new team Kazakhstan. They lost four of the matches, won their first match against Kazakhstan, and ended 5th in the Division. Switzerland was promoted

World Women's U18 Championship record

^Includes one win in extra time (in the round robin)
*Includes one loss in extra time (in the round robin)
**Includes two losses in extra time (in the round robin)

References

External links

Coverage of 2010 IIHF World Women's U18 Championship at hockey.no

Ice hockey
Ice hockey in Norway
Women's national under-18 ice hockey teams